Fortunella may refer to:

 Fortunella (plant), the genus of plants in which kumquats were formerly classified
 Fortunella (film), a movie